The Sherman Creek Generating Station was a coal-fired power plant built by the United Electric Light and Power Company in New York City, on Manhattan Island at 201st Street and the Harlem River.  The station supplied power to many customers, including the New York, New Haven and Hartford Railroad via the West Farms Substation.

The station site was bounded by 201st Street to the north, the Harlem River to the East, and Sherman Creek to the South.  United Electric Light and Power was later absorbed into Consolidated Edison, and the station was demolished.  The site is now occupied by an enclosed ConEd substation.

Aerial photo (says 1951)

References
"Alternating-Current Supply in New York City", Electrical World, two part article: Feb 7, 1914, pp. 307–311, and Feb 14, 1914, pp. 365–369.  Retrieved from archive.org on 4/17/2011.
"Feeding Heavy Single-Phase Load from Three-Phase Units", Electrical World, Vol. 66, No. 24, pp. 1300–1302, 1915.  Retrieved on 2/14/2011.  Primarily focused on turbine generator details at Sherman Creek Generating Station.
Railway Power Stations of New York City, IEEE Global History Network. Retrieved 1/31/2011.

Former coal-fired power stations in the United States
Consolidated Edison
Former power stations in New York City